Eaglecrest Ski Area is a public ski area on Douglas Island in the U.S. state of Alaska, across Gastineau Channel from Juneau. The area is owned and operated by Juneau's municipal government. Eaglecrest has 4 double chairlifts accessing , with 36 marked alpine runs, two Nordic skiing loops, and access to world class backcountry.

Southeast Alaska's only ski area, Eaglecrest's season generally runs from the first weekend of December through mid-April.

Eaglecrest is family and community-oriented, with many community outreach programs available, including a snowsports school offering lessons to students with physical and learning disabilities.

Eaglecrest now has 36 official alpine runs to go with East & West Bowls, Pittman's Ridge, Hilda & Benches Glades, and 8km of Nordic trails. When snow and staffing allows, the mountain also offers a Terrain Park.

References

External links

SkiJuneau.com - official site

Buildings and structures in Juneau, Alaska
Ski areas and resorts in Alaska
Tourist attractions in Juneau, Alaska